Barre granite /ˈbæri/  is a Devonian granite pluton near the town of Barre in Washington County, Vermont. Richardson described it as a "fine granite, composed of quartz, feldspar, and mica. The mica is both muscovite and biotite."  It intrudes into the Waits River Formation.

Building and sculpting stone 
The granite is mined at the E. L. Smith Quarry, the world's largest "deep hole" granite quarry, owned by the Rock of Ages Corporation. All of the stones in the Hope Cemetery in neighboring city of Barre are made with Barre granite.  "Barre Gray" granite is sought after worldwide for its fine grain, even texture, and superior weather resistance.

Many sculpture artists prefer it for outdoor sculpture. Sculptor Frank Gaylord used it for the United States Korean War Memorial at the United Nations Memorial Cemetery, Busan, South Korea.

References

Granite formations
Building stone
Sculpture materials
Quarries in the United States
Geography of Washington County, Vermont
Barre (city), Vermont
Barre (town), Vermont
Devonian magmatism